Li Bowen (born 23 January 1995) is a Chinese footballer currently playing as a defender for Sichuan Jiuniu.

Career statistics

Club
.

References

1995 births
Living people
Chinese footballers
Chinese expatriate footballers
Association football defenders
China League One players
China League Two players
Campeonato de Portugal (league) players
Beijing Guoan F.C. players
Meizhou Hakka F.C. players
C.D. Aves players
C.D.C. Montalegre players
Sichuan Jiuniu F.C. players
Chinese expatriate sportspeople in Portugal
Expatriate footballers in Portugal